McWillie is a surname. Notable people with the surname include:

Adam McWillie (1821–1861), United States Army and Confederate States Army officer
William McWillie (1795–1869), American politician